Prospect Park is a borough in Delaware County, Pennsylvania, United States. The population was 6,454 at the 2010 census, down from 6,594 at the 2000 census. It originated as a bedroom community of Philadelphia. It is located within  of Center City, Philadelphia, with convenient rail access (SEPTA, and connection to Amtrak).

History 
In 1874, John Cochran of Chester purchased 103 acres from Joshua Pierson with the intention of dividing the property into lots and selling them. These properties formed the current community of Prospect Park.

Prospect Hill Baptist Church in Prospect Park claims a prominent role in instituting the phrase "In God We Trust" on United States coins and currency. A former pastor, Mark R. Watkinson, felt that the Civil War was going to leave the country with a bad name, "brother fighting brother in a civil war", and wrote a letter to Salmon P. Chase, Secretary of the Treasury, suggesting "God, Liberty, Law," be put on the coins. Chase referred the matter to James B. Longacre, Mint Engraver. A committee later settled on "In God We Trust", and the words first appeared on a 2-cent coin. A plaque on the outside of the church announces the birthplace of the phrase.

The Morton Homestead, one of the oldest buildings in Pennsylvania, was listed on the National Register of Historic Places in 1970.

Geography
Prospect Park is located in southeastern Delaware County at  (39.885712, -75.307166). It is bordered to the east by Norwood, to the south by Tinicum Township, to the west by Ridley Park, and to the west and north by Ridley Township.

Transportation

U.S. Route 13 crosses the borough, leading northeast to Philadelphia and southwest  to Chester. Pennsylvania Route 420 (Lincoln Avenue) crosses US 13 and leads north  to Morton and south  to Interstate 95 at Exit 9.

Prospect Park Station is a SEPTA train station on the Wilmington/Newark Line.

Demographics

As of Census 2010, the racial makeup of the borough was 92.6% White, 3.0% African American, 0.2% Native American, 1.8% Asian, 0.6% from other races, and 1.8% from two or more races. Hispanic or Latino of any race were 1.9% of the population .

As of the census of 2000, there were 6,594 people, 2,577 households, and 1,600 families residing in the borough.  The population density was 8,859.7 people per square mile (3,440.5/km2).  There were 2,683 housing units at an average density of 3,604.9 per square mile (1,399.9/km2).  The racial makeup of the borough was 95.44% White, 1.38% African American, 0.12% Native American, 1.74% Asian, 0.02% Pacific Islander, 0.39% from other races, and 0.91% from two or more races. Hispanic or Latino of any race were 0.91% of the population.

There were 2,577 households, out of which 32.4% had children under the age of 18 living with them, 46.0% were married couples living together, 12.1% had a female householder with no husband present, and 37.9% were non-families. 30.9% of all households were made up of individuals, and 8.7% had someone living alone who was 65 years of age or older.  The average household size was 2.49 and the average family size was 3.20.

In the borough, the population was spread out, with 25.6% under the age of 18, 8.2% from 18 to 24, 32.4% from 25 to 44, 19.9% from 45 to 64, and 13.8% who were 65 years of age or older.  The median age was 36 years.  For every 100 females, there were 92.5 males.  For every 100 females age 18 and over, there were 89.9 males.

The median income for a household in the borough was $45,244, and the median income for a family was $51,966. Males had a median income of $38,914 versus $30,717 for females. The per capita income for the borough was $19,801.  There are 3.6% of families living below the poverty line and 4.3% of the population, including 2.6% of under eighteens and 12.1% of those over 64.

Education
Students living in Prospect Park attend classes within the Interboro School District, which consists of Prospect Park and its neighboring regions Glenolden, Norwood, and Tinicum Township.

The school district's administrative offices are located within the borough, as is Interboro High School.

Famous Residents

W. Carter Merbreier created and co-hosted the long-running syndicated children's television series, Captain Noah and His Magical Ark, in 1967. He was born in Prospect Park on August 26, 1926.

References

External links

 Borough of Prospect Park official website

Populated places established in 1894
Boroughs in Delaware County, Pennsylvania